Diver Down is the fifth studio album by American rock band Van Halen and was released on April 14, 1982. It spent 65 weeks on the album chart in the United States and had, by 1998, sold four million copies in the United States.

Background
The album cover artwork displays the "diver down" flag used in many US jurisdictions to indicate a SCUBA diver is currently submerged in the area. Asked about the cover in a 1982 interview with Sylvie Simmons (Sounds, June 23, 1982), David Lee Roth said it was meant to imply that "there was something going on that's not apparent to your eyes. You put up the red flag with the white slash. Well, a lot of people approach Van Halen as sort of the abyss. It means, it's not immediately apparent to your eyes what is going on underneath the surface." While impressed by Roth's creative marketing spin, manager Noel Monk also explained the sophomoric sexual double-entendre "dive her down" in his 2017 band memoir Running with the Devil. The back cover of the album features a photo by Richard Aaron of Van Halen on stage at the Tangerine Bowl in Orlando, Florida, that was taken on October 24, 1981, as they concluded a set opening for The Rolling Stones.

Music
Five of the twelve songs on the album are covers, the most popular being the cover of "(Oh) Pretty Woman", a Roy Orbison song. In retrospect, it turned out to be one of the Van Halen brothers' least-favorite albums, with Eddie stating "I would rather bomb with my own music than be the world's biggest cover band."  

However, at the time while he admitted to the pressure the band was put under to record it, he was able to tell Guitar Player (Dec. 1982) that it "was fun":

In addition to this, two of the original songs were around long before the album was made. "Hang 'Em High" can trace its roots back to the band's 1976 bootlegs as "Last Night", which had the same music but different lyrics.  "Cathedral" was played in its current form throughout 1981 with earlier versions going back to 1980. Additionally, "Happy Trails" had been recorded for their 1977 demos.

Songs
Two interviews from the period give the best account of how the band – especially Roth and Eddie Van Halen – saw the album at the time. The comments here are taken from Roth's interview with Sylvie Simmons (Sounds, June 23, 1982) and Eddie's interview with Jas Obrecht (Guitar Player, Dec. 1982).

"Where Have all the Good Times Gone"
Dave: "We're capable of playing six different Kinks' songs. Because at one time, back in our bar days, I bought a double album from K-Tel or something that had 30 Kinks tunes on it. We learned all of one side and played them into the dirt during the club gigs, twice a night each one, because they sounded so good and they were great to dance to, etc., etc."

Eddie: "The solo was more sounds than lines. I ran the edge of my pick up and down the strings for some of those effects. I think I used my Echoplex in that song."

"Hang 'Em High"

Dave: "It's like all those Westerns where there's some kind of dissonant sound in the background. Like they'll have one harmonica that hits only one note—eeeeeeeeee—and that's when you know the hero is coming to town or something terrible is going to happen. And what happens is Edward will come up with a song or a riff and then immediately I'll hear it and I'll know right away what the scenario is."

Eddie: "The solo was just loose, fun, craziness. I play it better every night than I did on the record, but who cares? It has feeling. Actually that was a really old song."

"Cathedral"
Eddie: "I've been doing 'Cathedral' for more than a year and I wanted to put it on record... it sounds like a Catholic church organ, which is how it got its name. On that cut I use the volume knob a lot. If you turn it up and down too fast, it heats up and freezes. I did two takes of that song, and right at the end of the second take, the volume knob just froze, just stopped."

"Secrets"

Dave: "The nucleus of the lyrics come from greeting cards and get-well cards that I bought in Albuquerque, New Mexico, on the last tour, and they were written in the style of American Indian poetry. 'May your moccasins leave happy tracks in the summer snows'."

Eddie: "I used a Gibson doubleneck 12-string, the model Jimmy Page uses, and played with a flatpick. The solo in 'Secrets' was a first take. I kind of laid back, and it fit the song."

"Intruder" 
The track "Intruder", which precedes "(Oh) Pretty Woman", was written specifically to cover the length of the promotional video for the "(Oh) Pretty Woman" single. In his 1982 interview with Simmons, Roth takes credit for "Intruder", stating: "I wrote that... When we finished the movie (i.e., the video) it was about three minutes too long. So, I said, we won't cut any of it; we'll write soundtrack music for the beginning. So we went into the studio and I played the synthesizer and I wrote it. It took about an hour to put that together."

"(Oh) Pretty Woman"

The music video for "(Oh) Pretty Woman" was one of the first banned by MTV, although VH1 Classic (now MTV Classic) has continuously aired it in recent years. In 1982, Roth explained the ban as the result of complaints that it made fun of "an almost theological figure", the Samurai warrior (played by Michael Anthony), and also because two little people appeared to molest a woman (actually a Los Angeles area transvestite performer). The video, directed by Roth and Pete Angelus, was, he said: "rather like a surrealistic art project ... where they paint the picture and come back three days later and try to figure out what they meant."

"Dancing in the Street"

Dave: "It sounds like more than four people are playing, when in actuality there are almost zero overdubs — that's why it takes us such a short amount of time [to record]."

Eddie: "It takes almost as much time to make a cover song sound original as it does writing a (brand new) song. I spent a lot of time arranging and playing synthesizer on 'Dancing in the Streets,' and (the [critics]) just wrote it off as, 'Oh, it's just like the original.' So forget the critics! These are good songs. Why shouldn't we redo them for the new generation of people?"

"Little Guitars"

Dave: "Edward was saying he'd just seen this TV show with a flamenco guy doing all these wonderful things with his fingers, and he says 'I've figured out how to do it with one pick, watch this.' And he did it. And it sounded better than the original... It sounded Mexican to me, so I wrote a song for senoritas." The guitar used on the recording (and subsequent tour) was a miniature Les Paul, built by Nashville luthier David Petschulat and sold to Eddie on the earlier Fair Warning Tour.

Eddie: "I think that the best thing I do is cheat. I came up with the intro after I bought a couple of Carlos Montoya records. I was hearing his fingerpicking, going, 'My God, this guy is great. I can't do that.' So, I just listened to that style of music for a couple of days and I cheated! [Using a pick] I am doing trills on the high E and pull-offs with my left hand, and slapping my middle finger on the low E."

"Big Bad Bill (Is Sweet William Now)"

Dave: "I think it's a great song. And there's been this thread winding its way through all of Van Halen's music and all of our albums since beginning with 'Ice Cream Man.' I played acoustic guitar and songs like this for quite a while before I ever joined Van Halen. It's music. Why do I have to bang my head to every single song on every single album? I don't think the audience has that much lack of creativity or imagination."

Eddie: "It was Dave's idea to do 'Big Bad Bill'. He bought himself one of those Sanyo Walkman-type things with the FM-AM radio, and you can record off the radio if you like something you hear. He was up in his bedroom at his father's house and he found that if he stood in a certain spot and pointed his antenna a certain way, he picked up this weird radio station in Louisville, Kentucky. He recorded 'Big Bad Bill' and played it to us, and we started laughing ourselves silly and going, 'That is bad! Let's do it!' Dave suggested, 'Hey, we can get your old man to play the clarinet.' We said, 'sure.'

Dave: "I think when you hear Mr. Van Halen playing, you'll have an idea it's a shadow of where Eddie and Alex are now. There's a sense of humour in there, a lot of technique and a whole lot of beer!"

"The Full Bug"

Roth said 'PRFCs' were "great shoes for when the cockroach moves into the corner and you can't get at it with your foot or the broom anymore. You just jam your toe into the corner and hit as hard as you can. And if you did it right you got the full bug. So this slang means — bammm! — you have to give it everything you've got. Make the maximum effort, do everything possible, get the full bug."

Eddie: "Dave plays the acoustic guitar and harmonica on the intro of 'The Full Bug.' My lines in the middle of that are different. I've been doing a lot of stuff with Allan Holdsworth, and he inspires me."

"Happy Trails"

Dave: "Joke 'em if they can't take a fuck, Sylvie! You wouldn't believe the number of TV commercials and radio jingles this band can sing in four-part harmony."

Accolades
In 2022, Diver Down was named #3 of 'The 25 greatest rock guitar albums of 1982' list in Guitar World.

Track listing

Personnel
Van Halen
David Lee Roth – lead vocals, synthesizer on "Intruder", acoustic guitar and harmonica on "The Full Bug"
Eddie Van Halen – electric and acoustic guitars, backing vocals, synthesizer on "Dancing in the Street"
Michael Anthony – bass guitar, backing vocals
Alex Van Halen – drums

Additional personnel
Jan Van Halen – clarinet on "Big Bad Bill"

Production

Richard Aaron – photography
Pete Angelus – art direction
Ken Deane – engineer
Donn Landee – engineer
Jo Motta – project coordinator
Richard Seireeni – art direction
Ted Templeman – producer
Neil Zlozower – photography

Charts

Singles

Certifications

References

Further reading

Van Halen albums
1982 albums
Warner Records albums
Albums produced by Ted Templeman
Albums recorded at Sunset Sound Recorders